The countess (kontès in Guianan Creole) is a small shortbread cake, somewhat sweet, typical of French Guianan cuisine. It accompanies a dessert such as fruit sorbets or fruit salads and traditionally uses a fruit juice or champagne.

References

See also 
 French Guianan cuisine
 Dizé milé
 Duckanoo
 List of cakes

Creole culture
Desserts
Cakes